Galium labradoricum (Labrador bedstraw or northern bog bedstraw) is a plant species in the family Rubiaceae. It is widespread across Canada, found in all provinces and territories except Yukon. It also occurs in St. Pierre & Miquelon and in the northern United States, primarily in New England and the Great Lakes region,  from Maine to the Dakotas. It is endangered in Connecticut.

References

External links
Go Botany, New England Wildflower Society
Minnesota Wildflowers
Ontario Wildflowers

labradoricum
Flora of North America
Plants described in 1897